The 1869 Town of New Plymouth by-election was a by-election held  on 28 April 1869 in the  electorate during the 4th New Zealand Parliament.

The by-election was caused by the resignation of the incumbent, Harry Atkinson on 18 March 1869.

He was replaced by Thomas Kelly.

Frederic Carrington, who came second, was described as the Father of New Plymouth.

After the returning officer had declared the result of the poll, the candidate Mr Upjohn asked if he could have the names of the 15 people who voted for him; the returning officer said he would have to ask for permission from the Government.

Result
The following table gives the election result:

References

New Plymouth 1869
1869 elections in New Zealand
April 1869 events
Politics of Taranaki